Barbifrontia is a monotypic snout moth genus. It was described by George Hampson in 1901 and contains the species Barbifrontia hemileucella, described in the same publication. It is found in Australia.

References

Phycitini
Moths of Australia
Monotypic moth genera
Taxa named by George Hampson
Pyralidae genera